Donita Rose Cavett-Palad (born December 5, 1974) is a Filipino-American actress, TV host and former MTV Asia VJ.

Early and personal life
Donita Rose Cavett was born in Utah on 5 December 1974 and moved to the Philippines when she was five years old. She is the eldest daughter to an American father, William Kent Cavett, a military officer, and a Filipino mother, Evelyn Ramos, a teacher from Pangasinan. She attended high school at Brent International School and college at De La Salle University.

In 1997, Rose moved to Singapore to pursue a career as a video jockey for MTV Asia.

In 2001, Rose met Eric Villarama after she migrated to Angeles, Pampanga. After two years, she married Villarama in Santa Barbara, California in 2003. The couple had a son named Joshua Paul, born in 2004. In the summer of 2007, they moved to Manila.

In 2015, Rose reportedly had problems in her marriage of 12 years with Eric Villarama but she maintained a positive relationship with him and decided to live together once more despite admitting the fact that she almost signed their divorce papers. The following year, however, in an interview with Mo Twister on his online podcast Good Times with Mo aired on July 12, 2016, Rose publicly confirmed her separation with Villarama after she allegedly found Instagram photos of her husband with his new partner whom he reportedly started seeing in April 2016. Although the photos were taken down by Villarama the following day, other sources were able to screen capture one of the photos of Villarama and his new partner together.

Rose is a devout born-again Christian, and an active member of Victory Fellowship Church.

On September 24, 2022, Rose married gospel recording artist Felson Palad.

Career
As a teenager, Rose's acting debut began in That's Entertainment alongside co-star Gary Estrada with whom she had a relationship before moving to Singapore. Her first film was Gabo in 1989 by Regal Entertainment. In 1992, she starred in two Filipino sitcoms, Alabang Girls by Viva Entertainment and Ober Da Bakod, as well as its 1996 sequel Ober Da Bakod 2 where she played as Barbie Doll. In 2002, she starred with Piolo Pascual in the romantic drama film 9 Mornings as Elise Romasanta. In 2003, she starred in the Filipino comic book film adaptation of Mars Ravelo's Lastikman as Linda, the love interest of Hilario/Lastikman, played by Vic Sotto.

She formerly hosted ABS-CBN's morning news and entertainment show Umagang Kay Ganda. In May 2014, she hosted a former Filipino morning variety-talk show on GMA called Basta Every Day, Happy! which she co-hosted with Gladys Reyes, Alessandra De Rossi and Chef Boy Logro.

Rose appeared on the cover of the men's magazine FHM in its Singapore edition; she also appeared in the Malaysian, Thai and Filipino editions to which she was hailed as the "Sexiest Woman in 2001".

On April 15, 2021, Rose announced that she is a corporate chef for Island Pacific, a chain of grocery stores in the US that specialize in promoting Filipino food to anyone looking to buy them in California and Nevada.

Filmography

Television

Film

Notes

References

External links
 
   
 

1974 births
Living people
American emigrants to the Philippines
De La Salle University alumni
That's Entertainment (Philippine TV series)
Filipino television actresses
Filipino television personalities
Filipino Christians
Filipino evangelicals
Filipino Pentecostals
American actresses of Filipino descent
VJs (media personalities)
People from Angeles City
People from Pangasinan
Actresses from Pampanga
That's Entertainment Friday Group Members
Actresses from Utah
ABS-CBN News and Current Affairs people
ABS-CBN personalities
Filipino women comedians
GMA Integrated News and Public Affairs people
GMA Network personalities
Viva Artists Agency